The Parchments of Avroman (or Awraman) are three parchment documents, found in 1909 in a cave in the Hawraman region of Iranian Kurdistan. They were found in Tang-i Var, Kuh-e Salan Mountain, near the village of Shahr Hawraman. The documents were found in a sealed jar by a villager, and then sent to London in October 1913.

The documents date from 88/87 BC to 33 AD, with two written in Greek and one in Parthian. They document the sale of a vineyard and other land, and include the names of Pātaspak, son of Tīrēn and Awīl, son of Baænīn. They were translated by philologist Ellis H. Minns and published in the Journal of Hellenic Studies.

References

1st-century manuscripts
1st-century BC manuscripts
Archaeological discoveries in Iran
1909 in Iran
Parthian language
Greek manuscripts